Mixosiphonata is an extinct order of nautiloids that lived from the Carboniferous to the Early Cretaceous. It currently includes the genera Boggyoceras, Zhuravlevia, and possibly Ctenobactrites. They were the latest surviving orthoconic nautiloids, which had otherwise gone extinct in the Late Triassic.

References

Prehistoric cephalopod orders
Nautiloids